Digha  is a terminal railway station on the Tamluk–Digha branch line and is located in Purba Medinipur district in the Indian state of West Bengal.  It serves Digha sea-side area. The railway station is near New Digha beach.

History
The Panskura–Durgachak line was opened in 1968, at a time when Haldia Port was being constructed. It was subsequently extended to Haldia.

The Tamluk–Digha line was sanctioned in 1984–85 Railway Budget at an estimated cost of around Rs 74 crore. Finally this line was opened in 2004. This track was electrified in 2012–13.

New line
It's been proposed to connect Digha to Jaleswar via the Kharagpur–Puri line.

Digha Railway Station Picture Gallery

References

External links
Nearest Railway Stations to Digha Beach
Trains at Digha
 

Railway stations in Purba Medinipur district
Kharagpur railway division
Kolkata Suburban Railway stations
Transport in Digha